Rafael Hernández International Airport  is a joint civil-military airport located in Aguadilla, Puerto Rico. It is named after the Puerto Rican composer Rafael Hernández Marín. It is Puerto Rico's second largest international airport in terms of passenger movement. It is located in Porta del Sol tourist region, in Puerto Rico's west coast. It is also home to Coast Guard Air Station Borinquen and to the Caribbean Branch of the U.S. Customs and Border Protection Air and Marine Operations. The airport has the longest runway in the Caribbean region.

In the past, the airport has been served by major carriers like Capitol Air, Pan Am (II and III), Kiwi International Air Lines, TWA, American Airlines, Aeronaves de Puerto Rico and Delta Connection, and by Turkish Airlines Cargo on the cargo airline side. Taesa flew in 1996 from Benito Juárez International Airport in Mexico City, and at one time, Arrow Air flew domestic jet service between it and San Juan as well as to JFK International Airport in New York. Pan Am III also flew jets between Aguadilla and San Juan during the early 2000s. Currently, although the airport lacks non-stop flights to Asia, it is the only airport in Puerto Rico served by an Asian commercial airline, in this case by Emirates Sky Cargo.

History

In 1939, the Army sent Major George C. Kenney to Puerto Rico to conduct a preliminary survey of possible air base sites on Puerto Rico. He examined a total of 42 sites and declared that Punta Borinquen the best site for a major air base. Planted sugar cane farms covered some 3796 acres that the government purchased for military use in the first week of September 1939 at a cost of $1,215,000. Later that year, Major Karl S. Axtater assumed command of what was to become Borinquen Army Air Field.

With the establishment of an independent United States Air Force in 1947, the complex was renamed Ramey Air Force Base in 1948. Ramey AFB was home to a Strategic Air Command bombardment wing and housed a number of B-36 Peacemaker intercontinental bombers.  The B-36s were later replaced by B-52 Stratofortress heavy bombers and KC-135 Stratotanker aerial refueling aircraft, while a tenant weather reconnaissance squadron operated WB-47 Stratojet and WC-130 Hercules aircraft. Due to the size and weight of the B-36, the runway at Ramey had to be built to a length of 11,702 ft and a width of 200 ft, added an 870 ft Blast Pad at each end and a 50 ft shoulder on each side.

The closure of what became Ramey Air Force Base began in 1971 and lasted until 1973. Following its closure, it was converted into a civilian airport. It used to receive domestic commercial flights by Prinair and Vieques Air Link as well as service from JFK International Airport in New York City with Capitol Air, and 707 passenger flights from Miami with Southeast Airlines. It is also noted for being the place that the large clothing company, Wrangler Jeans used to land their planes filled with company-related cargo as part of their airline operation, Wrangler Aviation, which was later  renamed to Sky Lease Cargo.

In the mid and late 1970s, the Ahrens Aircraft Corporation attempted to set up operations at former USAF industrial facilities at the airport in order to manufacture the Ahrens AR 404 regional airliner, a short takeoff and landing (STOL) turboprop aircraft, with financial incentives promised by the Puerto Rican government for development. However, a subsequent government investigation over these incentives ensued and the project was cancelled after only two AR 404s were built at Rafael Hernández Airport.

In 2004, the Puerto Rico Ports Authority announced that it would be remodeling and expanding BQN to accommodate more flights and passengers. An expansion of the terminal building and a new parking lot were among the projects in mind, with said expansion being inaugurated on July 12, 2005.

Since the closure of Ramey AFB in 1974, the airport's control tower had remained standing, but was non-operational, limiting the airport to UNICOM communication as an uncontrolled airport.  Following refurbishment of the former USAF control tower in 2006 and 2007, the newly renovated control tower became operational on July 5, 2007.

On February 20, 2012, it was announced by both the mayor of Aguadilla and the U.S. Secretary of Commerce that the airport will be designated a "free trade zone" (FTZ), as are many other airports in the U.S., a move that is believed will improve the development of the airport and surrounding areas.

On April 10, 2014, Lufthansa Technik announced the creation of a maintenance, repair and overhaul center (MRO) at the airport.  This created operations for maintenance of Lufthansa Aircraft flying on the Americas, starting with 2 reconditioning lines by C and D checks for the Airbus A320, with plans to expand up to 5 reconditioning lines.

Passenger service
In 1988, Carnival Airlines and ATA began passenger jet service. In the 1990s, American Airlines, joined those two airlines, followed by Pan Am II and TWA. Carnival Airlines provided Airbus A300 service to John F. Kennedy International Airport in New York, Newark Liberty International Airport in Newark, New Jersey and Fort Lauderdale International Airport in Fort Lauderdale, Florida. In the early 1990s, Carnival Airlines also operated the first intra-Puerto Rican jet service from the airport to Ponce with Boeing 727s and Airbus A300s. Another carrier, Prinair, also had previously conducted operations at Rafael Hernández Airport. North Cay Airways also provided passenger air service from San Juan at some time during the airport's history.

In 2000, North American Airlines reopened passenger service with a non-stop flight to New York JFK three times a week. Later, Continental Airlines joined North American with a daily flight to their hub in Newark. Continental has since merged with United Airlines, and the latter airline has continued to provide service. Boston-Maine Airways began service to Orlando Sanford International Airport in Florida and to Santo Domingo.

In 2005 JetBlue began a daily flight to their hub at New York JFK. Soon after the arrival of JetBlue, North American ceased operations. As a result, JetBlue announced that it would add a second daily flight to New York JFK.

In 2006, Delta Connection began regional jet service to Atlanta, Georgia five times a week, although this service ended on January 20, 2007, as part of Delta's restructuring plan. Later in 2007, JetBlue began service to Orlando International Airport in Florida.

In the summer of 2007 Spirit Airlines announced plans to begin service from the airport to their hub in Fort Lauderdale, Florida with a flight five times a week during the summer. It then reduced its service frequency to a flight two times a week.

In 2007 there were 59 flights per week, 1 daily flight to New York City, 1 to Newark and Orlando and a flight 5 times per week to Fort Lauderdale.

Spirit increased their flight frequency to daily to/from Fort Lauderdale. In addition, Spirit added a daily non-stop service to Orlando in February 2008. JetBlue continued to have two daily flights to New York City after the holiday season, adding a second daily flight to/from Orlando on May 1, 2008.  On June 2, 2008, Pan Am World Airways Dominicana restored service between the airport and Santo Domingo-Las Americas as well as to Punta Cana in the Dominican Republic.

On May 24, 2022, Frontier Airlines launched service for the first time between Orlando International Airport (MCO). The new service operates three to four times weekly and marks the airline's 13th route serving Puerto Rico from destinations in the U.S. and the Caribbean.

Facilities
Rafael Hernández Airport covers an area of 1600 acres (647 ha). BQN has one runway, 8/26: 11,702 ft x 200 ft (3,567 m x 61 m) Asphalt/Concrete.

North Side
The north side of the airport consists of a passenger terminal with an international side capable of handling flights of over 200 passengers. It also hosts the Main Cargo Terminal, the FedEx Terminal, and the General Aviation Terminal. The north side also houses the Copeca Jet Center Executive Terminal, as well as five service hangars. The military side of the airport is also located on the north side, housing Coast Guard Air Station Borinquen, a United States Coast Guard facility, as well as the 141st Air Control Squadron (which operates at the Punta Borinquen Radar Station), a non-flying unit of the Puerto Rico Air National Guard. Many Federal law enforcement agencies such as the U.S. Customs and Border Protection, the United States Border Patrol Ramey sector and the CBP Air and Marine Operations Caribbean Branch based their operations on this side of the airport.

South Side
The south side of the airport is the largest portion of the airport, but is currently undeveloped. Since the airport was transferred from the U.S. Air Force and the General Services Administration (GSA) to Puerto Rico Port Authority in 1973, the south side has been the object of various disputes and competing political campaign promises by local elected officials and local political candidates. Despite such promises over the past four decades, the south side remains undeveloped. Under the administration of Sila M. Calderón and Aníbal Acevedo Vilá, a master plan was conceived to turn the south side into an air cargo hub for the Caribbean, but local residents objected to the use of the south side for cargo rather than a modern passenger terminal.

Passenger Terminal
The passenger terminal was upgraded to include air conditioning, more space for modern airline ticket counters and car rental counters. It consists of two gates, Gate 14 and Gate 15. Gate 15 is used for departures while Gate 14 is used for arrivals. The terminal is divided into two sections, domestic and the international, with the domestic side equipped with a United States Department of Agriculture facility, while the international side contains a United States Customs inspection facility.

Cargo Terminal
The cargo section of the airport is divided in two sections, the Main Terminal and the FedEx Terminal. The FedEx Terminal is home to FedEx and its local affiliates.  The remaining Cargo Carriers are located in the Main Terminal.

The U.S Coast Guard and various reserve components of the Armed Forces maintain a military presence within the former Air Force base. Many Federal law enforcement agencies such as the U.S. Customs and Border Protection, the United States Border Patrol Ramey sector and the CBP Air and Marine Operations Caribbean Branch operate at the airport.

Future expansion
A January 16, 2010 news report stated that the Federal Aviation Administration (FAA) approved a master plan to redevelop the Rafael Hernández Airport in Aguadilla that would involve an investment of $1 billion over the next 20 years. In 2010 the Aguadilla airport had two commercial passenger gates. The master plan calls for a total of 30 commercial passenger gates.

There are also plans to expand the airport access road.

There are official plans to renovate the runway to coincide with FedEx’s expansion. There are plans to add a second runaway to the airport.

In June 2021, an official plan of expansion was announced by the Puerto Rico Ports Authority and paid by the FAA. The expansion plan includes building a new runway to replace the current one completed by 2027 as the current runway has only five years left of service, having been built in the 1930s for World War II.

Aside from the new runway, a new passenger terminal and three new cargo warehouses are planned to be built. The Puerto Rico Ports Authority seeks to bring back airlines with the new expansion. There are also plans to renovate the airport's facilities including bathrooms, relocating stores, adding jet bridges and more.

Airlines and destinations

Passenger

JetBlue studied expansion for the 3 main airports in Puerto Rico for 2011 (Aguadilla, Ponce, and San Juan) and is one of two airlines that operate in all three airports. In the past American Airlines offered service to their hub in Miami from Rafael Hernández Airport. Previously the airport was closed due to the pandemic and passenger flights weren't permitted. On April 1, 2021, the airport reopened for passenger flights. The airport currently lacks service to many cities with Puerto Rican communities including: Boston, Chicago, Tampa, 
Hartford and others.

Cargo

Statistics
This table shows the continuous growth of passenger traffic at the airport since 2001, but affected in 2009 by the lack of new flights: For year 2007 the airport transported 400,473 passengers, nearly a 500% increase in five years. Rafael Hernández Airport has an average of 47 regular passengers flights per week.

Access
 Arecibo and points east including Isabela and Camuy are connected to the airport via PR-110.
 Mayagüez and points south including downtown Aguadilla, Rincon, and Cabo Rojo are connected to the airport via PR-107.

Accidents and incidents
 On April 26, 1991, Douglas DC-3C N136FS of Four Star Air Cargo was destroyed when a fire broke out in the cockpit whilst the aircraft was taxiing for take-off on a mail flight to Cyril E. King Airport, Charlotte Amalie, United States Virgin Islands.
 On February 3, 1992, a C-54 of Dominican airline Aerolineas Mundo-AMSA had a runway collision with a Lockheed Super Constellation, suffering a fire and being damaged beyond repair.
 On August 7, 2002, a a C-130 Hercules had taken off from BQN before crashing in Caguas, killing all 10 occupants.
 On August 30, 2013, a Martinair Cargo MD-11 aircraft, taking off for a flight to London Stansted Airport, suffered an engine fire and had to abort the takeoff. There were no injuries to the plane's crew, but the airplane suffered substantial damage to the number one engine, nacelle and aircraft's structure.

See also

 Transportation in Puerto Rico
 List of airports in Puerto Rico

References

External links
 
 
 Rafael Hernández Airport at OpenStreetMap

Buildings and structures in Aguadilla, Puerto Rico
Airports in Puerto Rico
2010 Central American and Caribbean Games venues